Livio Cesare Pavanelli (7 September 1881 – 29 April 1958) was an Italian film actor.

Pavanelli was born in Copparo, Ferrara, Emilia-Romagna, Italy and died in Rome in 1958 at age 76.

Selected filmography

 Mariute (1918)
Fabiola (1918)
 The Cheerful Soul (1919)
 Princess Giorgio (1920)
 The Sack of Rome (1920)
 A Woman's Story (1920)
 The Second Wife (1922)
 The Most Beautiful Woman in the World (1924)
Niniche (1925)
 The Story of Lilian Hawley (1925)
 Chamber Music (1925)
Dancing Mad (1925)
 My Friend the Chauffeur (1926)
 Unmarried Daughters (1926)
 The Queen of the Baths (1926)
 The Ride in the Sun (1926)
 Kissing Is No Sin (1926)
 The Laughing Husband (1926)
 Mademoiselle Josette, My Woman (1926)
 The Schimeck Family (1926)
 Accommodations for Marriage (1926)
 The White Horse Inn (1926)
 Die Königin des Weltbades (1926)
 The Queen of Moulin Rouge (1926)
 When I Came Back (1926)
 Floretta and Patapon (1927)
 Homesick (1927)
 The Marriage Nest (1927)
 Madame Dares an Escapade (1927)
 A Girl of the People (1927)
 The Long Intermission (1927)
 Luther (1928)
 He Goes Right, She Goes Left! (1928)
 Charlotte Somewhat Crazy (1928)
 Endangered Girls (1928)
 Restless Hearts (1928)
 The House Without Men (1928)
 Scampolo (1928)
 The Green Monocle (1929)
 Crucified Girl (1929)
 German Wine (1929)
 Love in the Snow (1929)
 The Woman of Yesterday and Tomorrow (1928)
 Women on the Edge (1929)
 Bobby, the Petrol Boy (1929)
 Foolish Happiness (1929)
 Der Hund von Baskerville (1929)
 Marriage Strike (1930)
 Pergolesi (1932)
 L'ultimo dei Bergerac (1934)
 The Song of the Sun (1934)
 The Last of the Bergeracs (1934)
 To Live (1937)
 Marcella (1937)

Bibliography

External links

1881 births
1958 deaths
Italian male film actors
Italian male silent film actors
Actors from Ferrara
20th-century Italian male actors